Traynor is an English and Irish surname found throughout the world.

The surname is most prevalent in the United States with 5,143 people bearing the surname, followed by England with 3,548 people, Ireland with 2,148 people, Scotland with 1,567 people, Australia with 1,251 people and Canada with 1,176 people. In Northern Ireland, 692 people bear the surname making it the 546th most common surname in the country.

Origins in England

The surname may descend from the Old English word "trayne" which means to trap or snare and may have been the name for a hunter. The name was recorded in the 13th century on tax records in County Durham and in Yorkshire as well. Yorkshire was probably one of the first strongholds for the English family branch. Early examples of the surname in England is Robert Treiner found in County Durham's tax records in the year 1243, Ann Traner from marriage records found in the year 1604 and Robertus Trainer found on Yorkshire poll tax records in 1379.

Another possible origin of the surname may be that it may have been given to horse trainers in medieval England. The name remains common mostly in Northern England, particularly in Yorkshire and Durham. The surname is also quite common in North West England as well, with high populations in Cheshire, Lancashire, Merseyside and Greater Manchester.

Origins in Ireland

The Irish surname may descend from "Threin Fhir" which means "strong man" in Irish Gaelic.  It is mentioned in the Annals of the Four Masters compiled in the years 1632–1636 at the convent of Donegal, by the chief author, Michael O'Clery, a monk of the order of  St. Francis as having descended from the Colla Dá Crich. In the Census of Ireland of 1659, from the poll money ordinance, the census describes the most common "Irish" names of County Monaghan and lists McTrenor among them citing 30 Irish McTrenor households.

Common in Monaghan and throughout Ulster, the name is associated with Kelley and other Ui Maine ancestry.  Legends from Clogher, Tyrone, Northern Ireland associate the name with Aedh Mac Cairthinn, the first Bishop of Clogher who was called Saint Patrick's "strong man". Some male Traynors conducting Y-DNA genealogy tests have traced their Y-DNA to z2961+ m222- R-FGC6562+ as an adjunct branch of the Ui Maine haplogroup descending from Máine Mór.

Traynors in Ireland may also be of Anglo-Irish origins. The surname may have been brought over to Ireland by English settlers during the British rule in Ireland. The surname and its variations have been found on numerous parish records for various different Church of Ireland congregations throughout Ireland. Some Traynors were also have been members of the ruling upper class in Ireland during the Protestant Ascendancy.

The last name of some Traynors in Ireland may descend from English settlers to the island. Many Traynors in Ireland are Anglo-Irish and/or Protestants. Some may also descend from settlers from the Plantation of Ulster.  Scot Traynors may be descendants of Clan Armstrong and came to Ireland during the Plantation of Ulster or are perhaps descendants of Traynors from Northern England.

Variations
Trainor, Trainer, Treanor, and Trayner are common variations.

People

Traynor
 Arnold Traynor (1896–1976), Australian rugby league footballer
 Bradley Traynor (born 1975), known as Wanda Wisdom, podcasting drag queen
 Charles "Chuck" E. Traynor (1937–2002), American pornographer, ex-husband of Linda Lovelace, then Marilyn Chambers
 Chris Traynor (born 1973), hardcore metal guitarist from Long Island, New York
 Des Traynor (1931-1994), Irish financier and accountant
 Donna Traynor, journalist, anchor on BBC Newsline
 Frank Traynor (1927–1985), Australian jazz musician
 Matt Traynor (1987), American musician former metalcore member of Blessthefall
 Michael Traynor (actor) (1975), American actor
 Frank Traynor, Irish bantamweight boxer, winner of the bronze medal at the 1928 Summer Olympics
 Harold Joseph "Pie" Traynor (1899–1972), professional baseball third baseman
 John "Jack" Traynor, Royal Marine whose paralysed legs recovered at Lourdes
 John Jay Traynor (1943–2014), American singer, member of the group Jay and the Americans
 James 'Jim' Sexton Traynor (born 1958), Scottish sports journalist of newspaper and radio
 Joanna Traynor, UK-born Nigerian-Irish author of Sister Josephine, Divine and Bitch Money
 John Traynor (criminal) (born 1948), Dublin criminal who was a contact for murdered journalist Veronica Guerin
 Kyle Traynor (born 1986), Scottish rugby union player
 Michael Traynor (1917–1970) was a leading member of Sinn Féin in the 1950s and 1960s.
 Oscar Traynor (1886–1963), Irish Fianna Fáil politician and revolutionary
 Paul Traynor (born 1977), Canadian ice hockey player
 Philip Andrew Traynor (1874–1962), American dentist and politician for the Democratic party from Wilmington, Delaware.
 Roger J. Traynor (1900–1983), served on the Supreme Court of California
 Susan Traynor (born 1944), also known as Noosha Fox, lead singer for the rock band Fox
 Robert Terence 'Bobby' Traynor (born 1983), English footballer for Kingstonian Football Club
 Stuart J. Traynor (1919–2008), American lawyer and politician
 Thomas Traynor (1881–1921), member of the Irish Republican Army hanged in Mountjoy Prison
 Tommy Traynor (1933–2006), Southampton footballer
 William Bernard Traynor VC (1870–1956), English soldier awarded the Victoria Cross for gallantry in the face of the enemy during the Boer War
 W. J. H. Traynor (1845-?), notable Orange Order member and leader of anti-Catholic and anti-Irish nativist group in the United States and Canada called the American Protective Association

Trainor
Bernard E. Trainor (1928–2018), American journalist and former marine officer
Bobby Trainor (born 1934), Northern Irish former association footballer
Charles St. Clair Trainor (1901–1978), Canadian lawyer, judge, and politician
Conor Trainor (born 1989), Canadian rugby union player
Danny Trainor (1944–1974), Northern Irish association footballer
David Owen Trainor, American television director
Jerry Trainor (born 1977), American actor, comedian, and musician
Jordan Trainor (born 1996), New Zealand rugby union player
Kendall Trainor (born 1967), American former football player
Kevin Trainor, Irish actor
Larry Trainor (1905–1975), American political activist
Luke Trainor (1900–1973), Australian rules footballer
Martyn Trainor (born 1944), South African former naval officer
Mary Ellen Trainor (1952–2015), American actress
Meghan Trainor (born 1993), American singer-songwriter and record producer
Mike Trainor (born 1981), American stand-up comedian and writer
Nicholas Trainor (born 1975), English former cricketer
Owen Trainor (1894–1956), Canadian politician and Member of Parliament
Patrick F. Trainor (1863–1902), American politician
Rick Trainor (born 1948), American-British academic administrator and historian
Wes Trainor (1921–1991), Canadian ice hockey player

Trainer
 Bob Trainer (1927–1982), Australian rules footballer
 David Trainer, American television director
 Douglas Trainer, former president of the National Union of Students of the United Kingdom
 Harry Trainer (1872–?), Welsh international footballer
 James Trainer (1863–1915), Welsh association football player of the Victorian era
 Joe Trainer (born 1968), American football coach and former player
 John Trainer (born 1943), former Australian politician.
 Marie Trainer (born 1940s), former mayor of Haldimand County, Ontario, Canada
 Melissa Trainer (born 1978), American astrobiologist
 Stephen Trainer, Scottish professional association footballer
 Ted Trainer, an Australian academic, author, and an advocate
 Todd Trainer, drummer for the band Shellac

Treanor
Jack Treanor (1922–1993), Australian cricketer

References

Surnames
Surnames of Old English origin
Surnames of British Isles origin
English-language surnames
Surnames of English origin
Surnames of Irish origin
Irish families
Surnames of Lowland Scottish origin
Surnames of Ulster-Scottish origin